Hilman Syah (born 25 May 1997), is an Indonesian professional footballer who plays as a goalkeeper for Liga 1 club RANS Nusantara.

Club career

PSM Makassar
He was signed for PSM Makassar to play in Liga 1 in the 2017 season. Hilman made his professional debut on 5 August 2018 in a match against Perseru Serui at the Andi Mattalatta Stadium, Makassar.

RANS Nusantara
Hilman was signed for RANS Nusantara to play in Liga 1 in the 2022–23 season. He made his league debut on 23 July 2022 in a match against PSIS Semarang at the Jatidiri Stadium, Semarang.

Career statistics

Club

Honours

Club
PSM Makassar
 Piala Indonesia: 2019

References

External links
 Hilman Syah at Soccerway
 Hilman Syah at Liga Indonesia

1997 births
Living people
Indonesian footballers
PSM Makassar players
RANS Nusantara F.C. players
Liga 1 (Indonesia) players
Association football goalkeepers
Sportspeople from South Sulawesi